Prize is a former settlement in Colusa County, California. It lay at an elevation of 49 feet (15 m). A post office operated in Prize from 1900 to 1919.

References

Former settlements in Colusa County, California
Former populated places in California